This is a list of player transfers involving Premiership Rugby teams before or during the 2017–18 season. The list is of deals that are confirmed and are either from or to a rugby union team in the Premiership during the 2016–17 season.  On 24 May 2017, London Irish are promoted into the Premiership, whilst Bristol were relegated back to the Championship for the 2017–18 season.

Bath

Players In
 Sam Underhill from  Ospreys
 Freddie Burns from  Leicester Tigers
 Darren Allinson from  London Irish
 Shaun Knight from  Dragons
 Josh Lewis from  Ebbw Vale
 Beno Obano promoted from Academy
 James Phillips from  Bristol
 Anthony Perenise from  Bristol
 Scott Andrews from  Cardiff Blues
 James Wilson from  Northampton Saints

Players Out
 Liam Forsyth to  Wigan Warriors
 George Ford to  Leicester Tigers
 Adam Hastings to  Glasgow Warriors
 David Denton to  Worcester Warriors
 Robbie Fruean to  Edinburgh
 Darryl Marfo to  Edinburgh
 Dave Sisi to  Zebre
 Daniel Bowden to  Auckland
 Guy Mercer to  Ospreys (season-loan)

Exeter Chiefs

Players In
 Matt Kvesic from  Gloucester
 Tom O'Flaherty from  Ospreys
 Toby Salmon from  Rotherham Titans
 Sam Simmonds promoted from Academy
 Nic White from  Montpellier
 James Freeman from  Jersey Reds
 Wilhelm van der Sluys from  Southern Kings

Players Out
 Dave Lewis to  Harlequins
 Damian Welch to  Cardiff Blues
 Will Hooley to  Bedford Blues
 Haydn Thomas retired
 Geoff Parling to  Munakata Sanix Blues/ Melbourne Rebels
 Tom Johnson retired
 Nikola Matawalu to  Glasgow Warriors

Gloucester

Players In
 Fraser Balmain from  Leicester Tigers
 Val Rapava-Ruskin from  Worcester Warriors
 Owen Williams from  Leicester Tigers
 Ben Vellacott promoted from Academy
 Jake Polledri from  Hartpury College
 Gareth Denman from  Northampton Saints
 Jason Woodward from  Bristol
 Freddie Clarke promoted from Academy
 Lloyd Evans promoted from Academy
 Ed Slater from  Leicester Tigers
 Ruan Ackermann from  Lions
 James Hanson from  Melbourne Rebels

Players Out
 Greig Laidlaw to  Clermont Auvergne
 James Hook to  Ospreys
 Matt Kvesic to  Exeter Chiefs
 Joe Batley to  Bristol
 Joe Latta to  Bristol
 Josh McNulty to  Harlequins
 Salesi Ma'afu to  Narbonne
 Mat Protheroe to  Bristol
 Dan Thomas to  Bristol
 Tom Lindsay to  Bedford Blues
 Sione Kalamafoni to  Leicester Tigers
 Yann Thomas to  Rouen
 Paul Doran-Jones to  Wasps
 Darren Dawidiuk to  London Irish
 Jonny May to  Leicester Tigers

Harlequins

Players in
  Demetri Catrakilis from  Montpellier
  Renaldo Bothma from  Bulls
  Dave Lewis from  Exeter Chiefs
  Phil Swainston from  Wasps
  Lewis Boyce from  Yorkshire Carnegie
  Josh McNulty from  Gloucester
  Francis Saili from  Munster
  Ben Glynn from  Bristol

Players out
  Tyler Gendall to  Bristol
  Matt Hopper to  Oyonnax
  Nick Evans retired
  Karl Dickson retired
  Matt Shields to  Rotherham Titans
  Netani Talei retired
  Dan Murphy to  Hartpury College
  Owen Evans to  Doncaster Knights
  Mark Reddish retired
  Ruaridh Jackson to  Glasgow Warriors
  George Lowe retired
  Marland Yarde to  Sale Sharks

Leicester Tigers

Players In
 George Ford from  Bath
 Sione Kalamafoni from  Gloucester
 Joe Ford from  Yorkshire Carnegie
 Jonah Holmes from  Yorkshire Carnegie
 Dominic Ryan from  Leinster
 Gareth Owen from  Scarlets
 Nick Malouf from  Australia Sevens
 Valentino Mapapalangi from  Manawatu
 Chris Baumann from  Wellington Lions
 Jonny May from  Gloucester
 Atieli Pakalani unattached
 Kyle Traynor from  Bristol
 Jake Kerr from  Edinburgh
 Tatafu Polota-Nau from  Western Force
 Facundo Gigena from  Jaguares

Players Out
 Fraser Balmain to  Gloucester
 Owen Williams to  Gloucester
 Freddie Burns to  Bath
 Jack Roberts to  Cardiff Blues
 Marcos Ayerza retired
 Oliver Bryant to  Jersey Reds
 Peter Betham to  Clermont Auvergne
 Riccardo Brugnara to  Rugby Rovigo
 JP Pietersen to  Toulon
 Ed Slater to  Gloucester
 Lachlan McCaffrey to  Brumbies
 Jono Kitto released 
 Tom Croft retired

London Irish

Players In
 Gordon Reid from  Glasgow Warriors
 Lasha Lomidze from  Krasny Yar
 Ben Meehan from  Melbourne Rebels
 Napolioni Nalaga from  Lyon
 Saia Fainga'a from  Brumbies
 Luke McLean from  Benetton
 Petrus du Plessis from  Saracens
 Manasa Saulo from  Toulon
 Filo Paulo from  Benetton
 Jake Schatz from  Melbourne Rebels
 Darren Dawidiuk from  Gloucester
 Franco van der Merwe from  Cardiff Blues
 Piet van Zyl from 
 Arno Botha from

Players Out
 Darren Allinson to  Bath
 Jason Harris-Wright to  Bristol
 Luke Narraway to  Coventry
 Ross Neal to  London Scottish
 Jerry Sexton to  Jersey Reds
 Gerard Ellis to  Dragons

Newcastle Falcons

Players In
 Maxime Mermoz from  Toulon
 Josh Matavesi from  Ospreys
 Joel Matavesi from  Redruth
 D. T. H. van der Merwe from  Scarlets
 Ryan Burrows from  Yorkshire Carnegie
 Sami Mavinga from  Lyon
 Gary Graham from  Jersey Reds
 Sam Stuart from  Richmond
 Tevita Cavubati from  Worcester Warriors
 Toby Flood from  Toulouse
 Cameron Cowell from  England Sevens
 Jake Ilnicki from  Northampton Saints

Players Out
 Marcus Watson to  Wasps
 Ben Harris to  Wasps
 Sam Egerton retired
 Adam Powell retired
 David Nelson to  Doncaster Knights
 Andrew Foster to  Rotherham Titans
 Daniel Temm to  Ealing Trailfinders
 Tom Catterick retired
 Mike Delany to  Bay of Plenty
 Mouritz Botha retired
 Opeti Fonua to  Agen

Northampton Saints

Players In
 David Ribbans from  Stormers
 Mitch Eadie from  Bristol
 Jamal Ford-Robinson from  Bristol
 Rob Horne from  Waratahs
 Cobus Reinach from  Sharks
 Piers Francis from  Blues
 Francois van Wyk from  Western Force
 Heinrich Brüssow from  NTT DoCoMo Red Hurricanes

Players Out
 Calum Clark to  Saracens
 Ethan Waller to  Worcester Warriors
 JJ Hanrahan to  Munster
 Lee Dickson to  Bedford Blues
 Howard Packman to  Bedford Blues
 Sion Bennett to  Cardiff Blues
 Gareth Denman to  Gloucester
 Sam Olver to  Worcester Warriors
 Louis Picamoles to  Montpellier
 George Pisi to  North Harbour
 Adam Parkins to  Derby
 Jake Ilnicki to  Newcastle Falcons
 James Wilson to  Bath

Sale Sharks

Players in
  Josh Strauss from  Glasgow Warriors
  Will Cliff from  Bristol
  Marc Jones from  Bristol
  Alexandru Tarus from  Béziers
  Jono Ross from  Stade Français
  WillGriff John from  Doncaster Knights
  Faf de Klerk from  Lions
  James O'Connor from  Toulon
  Marland Yarde from  Harlequins

Players out
  Mike Phillips retired
  Sam Tuitupou to  Coventry
  Sam Bedlow to  Bristol
  Matt Rogerson to  Jersey Reds
  Brian Mujati to  Ospreys
  Neil Briggs retired
  James Mitchell to  Connacht
  Andrew Hughes to  Sale FC
  Kieran Longbottom to  Saracens
  Dan Mugford to  Plymouth Albion
  Peter Stringer to  Worcester Warriors
  Jonathan Mills to  London Scottish
  Lou Reed to  Merthyr
  Ciaran Parker to  Munster
  Eifion Lewis-Roberts retired
  Laurence Pearce to  Mont-de-Marsan
  Charlie Ingall to  London Scottish
  Tim Jeffers released
  Magnus Lund released
  Tom Morton released

Saracens

Players In
 Christopher Tolofua from  Toulouse
 Liam Williams from  Scarlets
 Calum Clark from  Northampton Saints
 Tom Griffiths promoted from Academy
 Hayden Thompson-Stringer promoted from Academy
 Tom Whiteley promoted from Academy
 Will Skelton from  Waratahs
 Dominic Day from  Melbourne Rebels
 Kieran Longbottom from  Sale Sharks
 Sione Vailanu  unattached

Players Out
 Chris Ashton to  Toulon
 George Perkins to  Bristol
 Kelly Brown retired
 Jared Saunders to  Jersey Reds
 Neil de Kock retired
 Jim Hamilton retired
  to  Dax
 Samuela Vunisa to  Glasgow Warriors
 Petrus du Plessis to  London Irish
 Tim Streather retired
 Will Fraser retired
 Fa'atiga Lemalu to  Munakata Sanix Blues

Wasps

Players In
 Marcus Watson from  Newcastle Falcons
 Ben Harris from  Newcastle Falcons
 Antonio Harris from  Nottingham
 Gabiriele Lovobalavu from  Bayonne
 Juan de Jongh from  Stormers
 Paul Doran-Jones from  Gloucester
 David Langley from  Cambridge

Players Out
 Nick De Luca retired
 Alapati Leiua to  Bristol
 Phil Swainston to  Harlequins
 Tom Howe to  Worcester Warriors
 Kurtley Beale to  Waratahs
 Frank Halai to  Pau
 George Edgson to  Bedford Blues
 Ehize Ehizode to  Bristol
 Carlo Festuccia retired
 Piers O'Conor to  Ealing Trailfinders
 Tom Bristow to  Narbonne

Worcester Warriors

Players in
  Jamie Shillcock promoted from Academy
  Josh Adams promoted from Academy
  Ethan Waller from  Northampton Saints
  Simon Kerrod from  Jersey Reds
  Pierce Phillips from  Jersey Reds
  Tom Howe from  Wasps
  Joe Taufete'e unattached
  Michael Dowsett from  Southland Stags
  Jack Singleton promoted from Academy
  Huw Taylor promoted from Academy
  Sam Olver from  Northampton Saints
  David Denton from  Bath
  Peter Stringer from  Sale Sharks
  Andrew Durutalo from  Ealing Trailfinders
  Anton Bresler from  Edinburgh

Players out
  Val Rapava-Ruskin to  Gloucester
  Phil Dowson retired
  Tiff Eden to  Nottingham
  Sam Betty retired
  Andy Short retired
  Chris Vui to  Bristol
  Tevita Cavubati to  Newcastle Falcons
  Derrick Appiah to  London Scottish
  Charles Hewitt to  Houston Strikers
  Na'ama Leleimalefaga to  Brive
  James Johnston to  Brive
  Ryan Lamb to  La Rochelle
  Mike Daniels to  Hartpury College
  Kailus Hutchinson to  Coventry
  George de Cothi to  Loughborough Students RUFC
  Ryan Grant to  Glasgow Warriors
  Connor Braid to  Canada Sevens
  Jaba Bregvadze to  Krasny Yar
  Tom Biggs retired
  Auguy Slowik to  Jersey Reds
  Ben Fowles released
  Sam Ripper-Smith released
  Cooper Vuna released
  Christian Scotland-Williamson retired

See also
List of 2017–18 Pro14 transfers
List of 2017–18 RFU Championship transfers
List of 2017–18 Super Rugby transfers
List of 2017–18 Top 14 transfers

References

2017-18
transfers